German submarine U-995 is a Type VIIC/41 U-boat of Nazi Germany's Kriegsmarine. She was laid down on 25 November 1942 by Blohm & Voss in Hamburg, Germany, and commissioned on 16 September 1943 with Oberleutnant zur See Walter Köhntopp in command. She is preserved at Laboe Naval Memorial near Kiel.

Design
German Type VIIC/41 submarines were preceded by the heavier Type VIIC submarines. U-995 had a displacement of  when at the surface and  while submerged. She had two shafts and two  propellers.

U-995 was fitted with five  torpedo tubes (four fitted at the bow and one at the stern), fourteen torpedoes, and three anti-aircraft guns. The boat had a complement of between forty-four and sixty.

Armament

FLAK weaponry
U-995 was mounted with a single 3.7 cm Flak M42 gun on the LM 42U mount. The LM 42U mount was the most common mount used with the 3.7 cm Flak M42U. The 3.7 cm Flak M42U was the marine version of the 3.7 cm Flak and was also used by the Kriegsmarine on other Type VII and Type IX U-boats.

Additionally, the boat was armed with a pair of twin Flak 38 20mm "Flakzwilling" mounts immediately adjacent to the 37mm gun mount.

Sonar

Passive sonar
U-995 was fitted with a Royal Norwegian Navy design Balkongerät sometime during the 1960s and then removed sometime between 4 November 1971 and 13 March 1972.

Service history
The boat's career began with training at 5th Flotilla on 16 September 1943, followed by active service on 1 June 1944 as part of the 13th Flotilla. She later transferred to 14th Flotilla on 1 March 1945.

Wolfpacks
U-995 took part in five wolfpacks, namely:
 Dachs (1 – 5 September 1944) 
 Zorn (26 September – 1 October 1944) 
 Panther (16 October – 10 November 1944) 
 Stier (11 December 1944 – 6 January 1945) 
 Hagen (17 – 21 March 1945)

Fate
At the end of the war, on 8 May 1945, U-995 was stricken at Trondheim, Norway. She was surrendered to the British on 9 December and then transferred to Norwegian ownership in October 1948. On 1 December 1952 U-995 became the Norwegian submarine Kaura (Norwegian K class) and in 1965 she was stricken from service by the Royal Norwegian Navy. She then was offered to the West German government for the ceremonial price of one Deutsche Mark. The offer was refused; however, the boat was saved by the German Navy League, DMB. U-995 became a museum ship at Laboe Naval Memorial in October 1971.

Summary of raiding history

Gallery

See also
 List of submarine museums

Other surviving U-boats
 SM U-1

References

Notes

Citations

Bibliography

Clay Blair : Hitler's U-Boat War Vol II (1998).

External links
 Documentary about U995

German Type VIIC/41 submarines
U-boats commissioned in 1943
World War II submarines of Germany
Norwegian K-class submarines
Museum ships in Germany
Museums in Schleswig-Holstein
1943 ships
Ships built in Hamburg